Czeskie Kamienie or Mužské kameny ("Bohemian/Czech Rocks" or "Man Rocks" in Polish and Czech respectively),  and Śląskie Kamienie or Dívčí kameny ("Silesian Rocks" or "Maiden Rocks"),  is a twin peak and a rock formation situated in the western part of Krkonoše on Polish and Czech border within the Karkonosze National Park on the Polish–Czech Friendship Trail. The rocks are up to 8 m high.

Location 
The twin peak is located in the main ridge, between Śmielec and the Przełęcz Karkonoska. The border straddles the peak. A stone monument reminds the tragedy of the Czech journalist Richard Kalman, who died here during a snow storm on 14 January 1929.

References 

Mountains of Poland
Mountains and hills of the Czech Republic
Czech Republic–Poland border
International mountains of Europe